Despumosia is a monotypic moth genus of the family Noctuidae described by Nye in 1975. Its only species, Despumosia rubescens, was first described by Paul Köhler in 1952. It is found in Argentina's Chubut Province.

References

Cuculliinae
Monotypic moth genera